Irarum (fl. late 3rd millennium BCE) was the 13th Gutian ruler of the Gutian Dynasty of Sumer mentioned on the "Sumerian King List" (SKL). According to the SKL: Irarum was the successor of La-erabum. Ibranum then succeeded Irarum (likewise according to the SKL.)

See also

 History of Sumer
 List of Mesopotamian dynasties

References

Gutian dynasty of Sumer